Robert "Bob" Ginnaven (January 1, 1937 – February 17, 2008) was an American film and television actor.

Biography

Early life
Ginnaven was born one minute after midnight, Robert Addison Ginnaven, Jr. was officially the first baby born in Memphis, Tennessee in the year 1937. He was the only child born to Pauline (née Boals), and Robert Addison Ginnaven, Sr.. His mother worked for many years as a medical secretary in Downtown Memphis, and his father, who was in the Navy during World War II, worked for years as a deliveryman for Wonder Bread, also in Memphis.

Ginnaven, Jr. graduated from Southside High School in Memphis, and from the University of Memphis with a degree in English. Ginnaven initially was introduced to the theatre by a classmate who suggested he try out for a production at the University of Memphis, and he was hooked for life after that time.

After completing his degree, he moved to New York City where he studied under Lee Strassberg while trying to get his break into the business. Not being successful, he moved back to Memphis in 1958, where he met his first wife, Ila Verne (née Crews) at an open-call audition being held by the local PBS station. Married December 21, 1958, Bob and Ila had their first child, Robert Addison Ginnaven, III, on October 29, 1959. Not long after their son was born, Bob and Ila moved from Memphis to Little Rock, Arkansas where Ginnaven, Jr. was employed by KATV as a local weatherman and talk show host. On May 15, 1961, their second child and only daughter, Elizabeth Leigh Ginnaven, was born. Their last child, Christopher Crews Ginnaven, was born on August 7, 1962. Ginnaven went on from KATV to be employed in the advertising industry, where he would work for the rest of his life. Ila died of complications from lung cancer on August 31, 1994. A few years later, Bob remarried Ann Vickers who was at the time the director of sales at KATV, the same TV station Ginnaven, Jr. had started at when he first moved to Little Rock. The marriage lasted a number of years, but ultimately ended in an amicable divorce. Not long after Ginnaven, Jr. was divorced, he began to date a friend by the name of Jeanne Crews. Ginnaven, Jr. and Jeanne Ginnaven (née Crews) were soon married, and remained married until he died on February 17, 2008.

Acting career
Ginnaven appeared in minor or uncredited roles. Ginnaven was 37 when he made his film debut in Encounter with the Unknown, which was released in 1973. Ginnaven played Father Duane. In 1981, Ginnaven appeared on Dallas, appearing in only three episodes (Season 5, Episodes 5,6,7); Ginnaven was uncredited in the appearance. In 1992, Ginnaven appeared in his 18th and last movie called One False Move as Deputy Charlie. During the year, Robert had appeared in his 2nd and last television show called Dangerous Curves in only one episode (Season 1, Episode 12) as Matthew Carlson. According to some websites, it stated that Ginnaven was best known for his appearance in One False Move.  Ginnaven also had a small but noticeable appearance in White Lightning, where he plays a friend of Ned Beatty's character Sheriff J.C. Connors.

Personal life
Ginnaven married Jeanne Tyler Ginnaven; they lived in Little Rock, Arkansas. Jeanne had been present along with Robert until Robert's death on 17 February 2008, after which Jeanne had become a widow. She still lives in Little Rock.

External links
 

1936 births
2008 deaths
American male film actors
American male television actors
Male actors from Tennessee
Ginneven, Robert
20th-century American male actors